The 2012–13 Norfolk State Spartans men's basketball team represented Norfolk State University during the 2012–13 NCAA Division I men's basketball season. The Spartans, led by sixth year head coach Anthony Evans, played their home games at the Joseph G. Echols Memorial Hall and were members of the Mid-Eastern Athletic Conference. They finished the season 21–12, 16–0 in MEAC play be crowned MEAC regular season champions. The defending conference champion lost in the quarterfinals of the MEAC tournament to Bethune-Cookman. As a regular season champion who failed to win their conference tournament, they received an automatic bid to the 2013 NIT where they lost in the first round to Virginia.

Roster

Schedule

|-
!colspan=9| Regular season

|-
!colspan=9| 2013 MEAC men's basketball tournament

|-
!colspan=9| 2013 NIT

References

Norfolk State Spartans men's basketball seasons
Norfolk State
Norfolk State
Norfolk State Spartans men's basketball
Norfolk State Spartans men's basketball